Desert Lady / Fantasy is the fourth recording released by the Toshiko Akiyoshi Jazz Orchestra featuring Lew Tabackin.  Not to be confused with the 1989 Lew Tabackin (Quartet) Concord Records release, Desert Lady.  The album received two Grammy award nominations in the "Best Large Jazz Ensemble Performance" and (for the song, "Bebop") "Best Arrangement on an Instrumental" categories.

Track listing

All arrangements by Akiyoshi.  All songs composed by Akiyoshi except as noted:
 "Harlequin Tears" – 8:15
 "Desert Lady" / "Fantasy" (Tabackin / Akiyoshi) – 15:39
 "Hangin' Loose" – 9:38
 "Hiroko's Delight" – 8:48
 "Broken Dreams" (Tabackin) – 8:25
 "Bebop" (Gillespie) – 6:37

Personnel

Toshiko Akiyoshi – piano
Lew Tabackin – tenor saxophone, flute (piccolo)
Walt Weiskopf  – tenor saxophone, soprano saxophone, flute
Jerry Dodgion – alto saxophone, soprano saxophone, flute
Jim Snidero – alto saxophone, soprano saxophone, flute
Scott Robinson – baritone saxophone, bass clarinet
Michael Ponella – trumpet
John Eckert – trumpet
Greg Gisbert – trumpet
Joe Magnarelli – trumpet
Herb Besson – trombone
Luis Bonilla – trombone
Conrad Herwig – trombone
Tim Newman – bass trombone
Doug Weiss – bass
Terry Clarke – drums

Guest 
Daniel Ponce – conga drums (track 2, "Desert Lady" / "Fantasy")

References / external links
Columbia CK-57856
[ Allmusic]
1994 Grammy nominations, Best Large Jazz Ensemble Performance and (for the song, "Bebop") Best Arrangement on an Instrumental (LA Times link)

Toshiko Akiyoshi – Lew Tabackin Big Band albums
1994 albums